The 1907 Washington & Jefferson Red and Black football team represented Washington & Jefferson College as an independent during the 1907 college football season. Led by second-year head Frank Piekarski, Washington & Jefferson compiled a record of 7–2.

Schedule

References

Washington and Jefferson
Washington & Jefferson Presidents football seasons
Washington and Jefferson Red and Black football